The 2021 Euro Hockey League Cup was the first edition of the Ranking Cup, a secondary competition to Europe's premier club field hockey tournament, the Euro Hockey League. The tournament, organized by the European Hockey Federation, was held in Brasschaat, Belgium, from 30 September to 3 October 2021.

Format
As a secondary tournament to the Euro Hockey League, the Ranking Cup was created to determine the placings of the lower ranked teams for the 2020–21 EHL Season.

The tournament comprised 16 teams, competing in a round of 16 format. The victorious teams from the first knockout games went on to compete in the placement matches for fifth to twelfth place. The losing teams contested ranking matches to determine thirteenth to twentieth places.

Original format
The tournament was originally scheduled to comprise eight teams in a knockout format, with the remaining 12 to appear at the Euro Hockey League. Due to the COVID-19 pandemic however, the EHL was rescheduled and reduced to four teams, with the remaining eight teams being added to the Ranking Cup.

Results

Bracket

Round of 16

Ranking matches

Thirteenth to twentieth places

Fifth to twelfth places

Final standings

5.  Dragons
5.  Den Bosch
5.  Kampong
5.  Mannheimer
9.  Arminen
9.  Minsk
9.  Rot-Weiss Köln
9.  Club de Campo
13.  Gantoise
13.  Hampstead & Westminster
13.  Surbiton
13.  Elektrostal
17.  Saint Germain
17.  Three Rock Rovers
17.  Dinamo Ak-Bars
17.  Grange

References

External links

Men's Euro Hockey League Ranking Cup
2020–21 in European field hockey
Field hockey events postponed due to the COVID-19 pandemic
September 2021 sports events in Belgium
October 2021 sports events in Europe
2021 Euro Hockey League
2021 in Belgian sport